César Augusto Cueto Villa (born 6 June 1952 in Lima) is a Peruvian former attacking midfielder, nicknamed "El Poeta de la zurda" (English: the Left-footed Poet), recognized as one of the most talented players that Peruvian soccer has produced.

He was one of the best South American midfielders between the 70s and 80s and probably the most technically gifted player that Peru produced in its history. Nicknamed «El Poeta de la Zurda», he was an attacking midfielder of exceptional ability, ball control, great vision of the game and capacity for assistance, as well as a very showy style that marked an era, characteristics that have made him win a place among the best left-footed midfielders in the history of Peruvian soccer.

He played 51 times for the Peru national team between 1972 and 1987 and was part of the squad that won the Copa América 1975. He also competed for Peru at the 1978 and 1982 FIFA World Cup. One of Peru's greatest footballers, Cueto was renowned for his agility, close control and passing range.

Biography

Club career
He started his professional career with a local club Alianza Lima in 1969, and between 1973 and 1974 he was on loan with the teams José Galvez and Deportivo Municipal. After Cueto's return to Alianza Lima in 1975, the club won the league titles of 1975, 1977, and 1978.

In 1979, he moved to Colombia to play for Atlético Nacional, where he became the team captain, and won the national title in 1981 with great performances. He received positive coverage and he was elected "Mustang Cup best player on the Year": 1980, 1981. He is also considered Atlético Nacional's most renowned player, and was Carlos Valderrama's favorite player and initial inspiration.

He signed with América de Cali in 1984, winning another league title that year with the club. also as captain and team leader.

After an injury in 1985, he retired from the national team but returned to play for Alianza after the 1987 air disaster; another injury struck him in 1988, forcing him away from playing. He played irregularly until his definite retirement in 1991.

International career
Also a member of the Peru national team, he earned 51 caps and scored 6 goals for Peru. He was part of the Peru squad that won the Copa America 1975 and represented it in the World Cups of 1978 – scoring in the opening match against Scotland – and 1982.

Cueto was part of the Peru team which eliminated Colombia and Uruguay in the World Cup Qualifiers in 1981. Peru won in the South American qualifying group B. In 1982, the Peru National team then toured North America and Europe. After losing to New York Cosmos, it went on to defeat Inter Milan and both the Hungary and France national teams. Cueto is best remembered for his great performance in the match against France of Platini on 28 April 1982 in Paris, which the France press acclaimed Peru national team as "one of the best teams in the world". Coming into the 1982 FIFA World Cup, there were high expectations for Peru as a dark horse favorite to win the cup with a team that included such notable players as Julio César Uribe, José Velásquez, Teófilo Cubillas and Cueto. With 2 draws and 1 defeat, Peru finished at the bottom of their group went out in the first round. Cueto himself had a disappointing tournament, Peru failed to advance to the next round, despite having an excellent team.

Also noteworthy was his strong appearance in the World Cup qualifying match against the Argentina in Buenos Aires in 1985. He contributed a scintillating pass to Geronimo Barbadillo for go-ahead goal (the game ended in a tie).

Participation in the World Cup

Personal life
Cueto is a practising Roman Catholic.
He is divorced, has four daughters and four grandchildren.

Honours

Individual awards
1980 Peruvian Footballer of the year
1981 Mustang Cup Best player on the year

References

External links

 Interview: Luis Fernando Suárez, Colombian manager
 Futbol Factory profile

1952 births
Living people
Footballers from Lima
Peruvian footballers
Peruvian Roman Catholics
Peru international footballers
1975 Copa América players
1978 FIFA World Cup players
1982 FIFA World Cup players
Peruvian Primera División players
Categoría Primera A players
Club Alianza Lima footballers
José Gálvez FBC footballers
Deportivo Municipal footballers
Atlético Nacional footballers
América de Cali footballers
Deportivo Pereira footballers
Cúcuta Deportivo footballers
Expatriate footballers in Colombia
Peruvian expatriate footballers
Copa América-winning players
Association football midfielders